KNFX-FM (99.5 FM) is a radio station broadcasting a Classic rock format. Licensed to Bryan, Texas, United States, the station serves the Bryan/College Station area.  The station is currently owned by iHeartMedia, Inc. and is a member of the Clear Channel Radio Network   The station's studios are located at Galleria Village on Briarcrest Drive in Bryan, and its transmitter is located a mile west near the property of unrelated Brazos Valley Communications radio outlets.

Between 1990 and August 18, 2001, it was owned by Felix Torres as Spanish language formatted KBMA, "La Fabulosa."

References

External links

NFX-FM
Classic rock radio stations in the United States
Radio stations established in 1990
Bryan, Texas
1990 establishments in Texas
IHeartMedia radio stations